Albiol may refer to:

Places
L'Albiol, a municipality in Tarragona, Spain

People
Miguel Albiol (born 1981), Spanish footballer
Raúl Albiol (born 1985), Spanish footballer
Sergio Albiol (born 1987), Spanish footballer
Xavier García Albiol (born 1967), Spanish politician